Gemini Powered Parachutes was an American aircraft manufacturer based in Culver, Indiana. The company specialized in the design and manufacture of powered parachutes in the form of ready-to-fly aircraft under the US FAR 103 Ultralight Vehicles rules and the European Fédération Aéronautique Internationale microlight category.

The company was founded by a former employee of Buckeye Industries. It seems to have been founded about 2002 and gone out of business in 2007.

Gemini produced a series of single-seat powered parachutes, including the Gemini Classic, Gemini Star, Gemini Ultra Star and Gemini Viper. There was also one two-seat trainer model, the Gemini Twin which had sold 60 aircraft by 2005.

Aircraft

References

External links
Company website archives on Archive.org

Defunct aircraft manufacturers of the United States
Ultralight aircraft
Homebuilt aircraft
Powered parachutes